Gureh may refer to:
 Goreh, Bushehr
 Guri, Hormozgan